Nanning railway station is the main railway station serving the city of Nanning, the capital of Guangxi Zhuang Autonomous Region, China. It is located in the city centre, at 82 Zhonghua Road, in the district of Xixiangtang.

Overview
The station opened in February 1951 and the upgrade of building and platforms, to allow high-speed train services also, was completed in December 2013. It is the junction point of the Nanning–Kunming railway, the Hunan–Guangxi railway, the Nanning–Fangchenggang railway, the Nanning–Guangzhou railway, the Liuzhou–Nanning Intercity railway, the Yunnan–Guangxi railway, and the Nanning–Pingxiang high-speed railway

Services
Rapid transit: Nanning Metro lines 1 and 2 are both connected to the station.
Regional services: the station is connected to Liuzhou, Guilin, Wuzhou, Guigang, Qinzhou, Fangchenggang, Beihai and others.
National services: the station is connected to Beijing, Shanghai, Guangzhou, Chengdu, Kunming, Xiamen, Nanjing, Shenzhen, Wuhan, Xi'an, Qingdao, Changsha and other major cities. One of this services is the "Beijing-Nanning Through Train".
International services: the station is served by the "Beijing-Nanning-Hanoi Through Train", that connects the Chinese and the Vietnamese national capitals. In long-term plan, the Nanning–Singapore economic corridor and of the Kunming–Singapore Rail Network, would connect Nanning Station to Cambodia, Malaysia and Singapore.

Notable events
In February 2019, Nanning railway station was the scene of a viral video of North Korea's leader Kim Jong-un smoking a cigarette during a break on his way to the Hanoi Summit with then American president Donald J. Trump.

See also
Nanning Rail Transit
Nanning Locomotive Depot

References

External links

Railway stations in Guangxi
Railway stations in China opened in 1951
Stations on the Liuzhou–Nanning Intercity Railway
Buildings and structures in Nanning